Gábor Bódy (30 August 1946 – 24 October 1985) was a Hungarian film director, screenwriter, theoretic, and occasional actor.  A pioneer of experimental filmmaking and film language, Bódy is one of the most important figures of Hungarian cinema.

Biography 

Bódy was born in Budapest, in an urban middle-class family. He studied history and philosophy at Loránd Eötvös University and later filmmaking at the Academy for Theater and Film Arts. During his university days he became an influential member of the Béla Balázs Stúdió (BBS). He made his first film A Harmadik (The Third) (a documentary about students preparing an adaptation of Faust on stage) in 1971. He established various experimental and avantgarde projects at BBS including the Film Language Series in 1973 and the K/3 experimental film group in 1976, reshaping the postwar Hungarian avantgarde film's path.

In 1975 he completed his debut feature at BBS, which was also his graduation thesis film at the university. Amerikai Anzix (American Torso) won the Grand Prize for best new filmmaker at ""International Filmfestival Mannheim-Heidelberg"" and the Hungarian Film Critics prize for best first film. The film which depicts the lives of Hungarian 1848 Revolution veterans in the American Civil War features Bódy's experimentalism at the fullest. The whole film was re-edited using his own method called "light editing" in order to make it resemble a wracked silent film from the late 19th century.

His next feature Nárcisz és Psyché was the largest-scale Hungarian production of its era. This epic production based on Sándor Weöres's poetic work Psyché starred Patricia Adriani, Udo Kier and György Cserhalmi and exists in three versions: an original 210-minute two-part version, a 136-minute version for foreign distribution and a 270-minute three-part television version.

In 1980 Bódy began to work on the first international video magazine INFERMENTAL and managed to publish the first of 10 issues (plus one special issue) while on a residency at DAAD Berliner Küunstlerprogram in 1982. The series published featured a range of guest editors and in total included work from over 1500 artists from 36 countries and was published up to 1991.

After many frustrated projects Bódy managed to complete what was to become his final feature film Kutya éji dala (Dog's Night Song). Bódy cast himself as the lead in this ambitious and influential feature which incorporated Super8 and video footage as well as a range of Hungarian underground punk bands (Galloping Coroners, Trabant) of the time in order to a film "deeply rooted in the fundamentals of today's reality."

In 1985 Bódy died under sketchy circumstances. A later published information (2001) hints his earlier collaboration (1973–1983) with the Hungarian Secret Police, the III/III. Authorities of the time (Hungary was then considered a 'satellite' country of the Soviet Union) stated that he had killed himself. His widow instead preferred a charge of murder against certain unidentified parties. No official investigation followed and Bódy's fate remains a mystery to this day.

Filmography

Feature films

1975 : Amerikai Anzix / American Postcard
Hungary, 35mm scope, B&W, 104'

1980 : Nárcisz és Psyché / Narcissus and Psyche
Hungary, 35mm scope, colour, one part foreign version 136' two-part version 270' three-part TV version 270'

1983 : Kutya éji dala / The Dog's Night Song
Hungary, 35mm, colour, 147'

TV films

1976 : Filmiskola / Film School
Hungary, 16mm, B&W, 87'

1977 : Katonák / Soldiers
Hungary, TV, colour, 90min

1978 : Krétakör / Chalk Circle
Hungary, TV, colour, 95min

1981-82 : Hamlet (A fegyveres filozófus) / Hamlet (The Armed Philosopher)
Hungary, TV, colour, 173min

Short Films & Videos

1971 A Harmadik / The Third
Hungary, 35mm, B&W, 50'

1972  Fogalmazvány a féltékenységrõl / Draft on Jealousy
Hungary, 16mm, B&W, 20'

1972 : Ifivezetok / Youth Organisation Leaders
Hungary, 16mm, B&W 42'			

1973 : Tradicionális Kábítószerünk / Our Traditional Drope
Hungary, 16mm, B&W, 30'

1972-75 : Négy bagatell / Four Bagatells
Hungary, 35mm, B&W, 28'

1974 : Hogyan verekedett meg Jappe és do Escobar után a világ / After Jappe and Do Escobar fought how did the world come to fight
Hungary, 16mm, B&W, 40'			

1976 : Pszihokozmoszok / Psychocosmoses
Hungary, 35mm, B&W, 12'				

1978 : Privát történelem / Private History (co-dir. Péter Timár)
Hungary, 35mm, B&W, 25'			

1980 : Mozgástanulmányok 1880-1980 (Homage to Eadweard Muybridge) / Motion Studies 1880-1980 (Homage to Eadweard Muybridge)
Hungary, 35mm scope, colour, 18'		

1982 : Conversation between East and West co-director Marcel Odenbach
Germany, video, colour, 3'

1982 : Die Geschwister/ Brother and Sister
GDR / Hungary, video, colour, 27'	
	
1982 : Der Dämon in Berlin / The Demon In Berlin
GDR / Hungary, super8 and video, colour, 28'				

1983 : Die Geisel / The Hostage
GDR / Hungary, video, colour, 22'				

1983 : De Occulta Philosophia / Philo-clip
GDR / Hungary, video, colour, 3'

1983 : Rittersrustung / Armour
GDR, video, colour, 40'

1984 Vagy-vagy a Chinatownban / Either/Or In Chinatown
Canada / GDR, video, colour, 37'

1985 : Euronyme tanca (Mytho-clip) / Dancing Eurynome (Mytho-clip)
Hungary, video, colour, 3'			

1985 :  Waltzer (Lyric-clip) / Waltz (Lyric-clip)
GDR, video, colour, 3'

Miscellaneous crew
1969 :  Agitátorok/Agitators dir. Dezső Magyar (35mm, 82')
Screenplay, actor

1976 : Aldrin dir. László Vidovszky (35mm, 14')
Camera

Bibliography 
 Kovács, András Bálint: Gábor Bódy: A precursor of the Digital Age.- In: Imre, Anikó (ed.): East European Cinemas. New York, London: Routledge, 2005, p. 151-164
 Bódy, Veruschka; Bódy, Gábor (ed): Axis. Auf der elektronischen Bühne Europa. Eine Asuwahl aus den 80er Jahren. [Book accompanying video tape] - Cologne: DuMont, 1986  (VHS)
 Bódy, Veruschka; Bódy, Gábor (ed): Video in Kunst und Alltag. Vom kommerziellen zum kulturellen Videoklip. - Cologne: DuMont, 1986

References

External links 
 BodyGabor.hu (Partially English website dedicated to Gábor Bódy's work)
 Revisited: Gábor Bódy. Celebrating the Availability of American Torso on DVD
 infermental.de
 Béla Balázs Stúdió (BBS)
 Béla Balázs Stúdió Archive (BBSarchive)

Hungarian film directors
1946 births
1985 deaths
Suicides in Hungary
Hungarian experimental filmmakers